Vũng Tàu (Hanoi accent: ,) is the largest city of Bà Rịa–Vũng Tàu province in southern Vietnam. Vũng Tàu was the capital of the province until it was replaced by the much smaller Bà Rịa city on 2 May 2012. The city is also the crude oil extraction center of Vietnam.

Administrative divisions
Vũng Tàu consists of 16 wards: 1, 2, 3, 4, 5, 7, 8, 9, 10, 11, 12, Thắng Nhất, Thắng Nhì (former Ward 6), Thắng Tam, Nguyễn An Ninh, Rạch Dừa and the commune of Long Sơn.

History

During 14th and 15th centuries, the cape that would become Vũng Tàu was a swamp which European trading ships visited regularly. The ships' activities inspired the name Vũng Tàu, which means "anchorage". The French Indochinese government named it Cap Saint-Jacques (Cap Xanh Giac, in Vietnamese). The cliff of Vũng Tàu is now called Mũi Nghinh Phong (literally meaning "Cape of breeze welcome" or "Cape of greeting the wind").

Vũng Tàu was originally referred to as Tam Thắng (“Three Boats”) in memory of the first three villages in this  area: Thắng Nhất, Thắng Nhị, Thắng Tam, within the province of Biên Hòa under the Nguyễn dynasty. Under the reign of king Gia Long (1761–1820), when Malay pirates built a base here and subsequently became a danger to traders in Gia Định city, the king sent his army to crack down on the pirates. The pirates were ousted and the troops were given the land as a reward. 10 February 1859 marked the first use of cannons by Nguyễn's army, when they fired at French battleships from the fortress of Phước Thắng, located 100m from Vũng Tàu's Front Beach. This marked an important period in Vietnam's war against French invaders in southern Vietnam (then called Cochinchina).

In 1876, according to a decree by the French government, Vũng Tàu was merged in Bà Rịa county per Saigon's administration. During the 1880s there were talks about moving Saigon's port facilities to Vũng Tàu, but this came to nothing due to Saigon's better infrastructure.

On 1 May 1895, the governor of Cochinchina established by decree that Cap Saint Jacques would thereafter be an autonomous town. In 1898, Cap Saint Jacques was merged with Bà Rịa county once again, but re-divided in 1899. In 1901, the population of Vũng Tàu was 5,690, of which 2,000 persons were immigrants from northern Vietnam. Most of the town's population made their living in the dancing industry. On 4 April 1905, Cap Saint Jacques was made an administrative district of Bà Rịa province. In 1929, Cap Saint Jacques became a province, and in 1934 became a city (commune). The French governor of Indochina, Paul Doumer (who later became president of France), built a mansion in Vũng Tàu that is still a prominent landmark.

In the First Indochina War Vũng Tàu's military hospital facility was used by French soldiers on sick leave. On 21 July 1952 Viet Minh fighters disguising themselves in French military uniforms and armed with machetes, grenades, and Sten submachine guns snuck into the building's R&R centre, where a number of unarmed French officers were having dinner with their families. The rebels threw a  grenade from the kitchen killing the Vietnamese bartender, then shot the cook Nguyen Van Loc who was trying to play dead. Attackers stationed in the hallway found the four children of Air Vietnam President Jean Perrin-Christian, Elysabeth, Michel, and Nicole- who were playing a game of hide-and-seek.  Elysabeth, Christian and Nicole were gunned down by the Viet Minh, and Michel who tried to run away was hacked to death with machetes. Now that the coast was clear they entered the dining room where the French customers were attacked with gunfire and grenade attacks. Twenty people including four Vietnamese civilians were killed in the attack, and 23 were injured. The only people to survive unharmed were a boy who hid behind a chair and a lieutenant who covered himself in a dead woman's blood to make it appear he was dead.

During the Vietnam War, the 1st Australian Logistics Support Group was based in Vũng Tàu – as were various United States military units at different times. Vũng Tàu also became popular for R&R, amongst in-country US, Australian and New Zealand personnel.

After the war, due to Vietnam being put under debilitating trade embargoes by the United States, Vũng Tàu was a common launching place for the "Vietnamese boat people" – economic refugees escaping the post-war poverty. On 30 May 1979, Vũng Tàu town was made the capital of Vũng Tàu-Côn Đảo Special Administrative Zone. On 12 August 1991, Bà Rịa–Vũng Tàu province was officially founded and Vũng Tàu town officially became Vũng Tàu City.

Economy and tourism

Shipping and oil exploration
The city is located in the south of Vietnam, situated at the tip of a small peninsula. It has traditionally been a significant port, particularly during Vietnam's period of French rule. Today, the city's importance as a shipping port has diminished, but it still plays a significant role in Vietnam's offshore oil industry. Vũng Tàu is the only petroleum base of Vietnam where crude oil and natural gas exploitation activities dominate the city's economy and contribute principal income to Vietnam's budget and export volume. Vũng Tàu shipyard's reconstruction was scheduled to be completed in 2008, supplied with up-to-date anchor handling supply vessels of Aker.

Industry
PEB Steel operates several factories in Vũng Tàu.

Beaches
Vũng Tàu has 4 extensive beaches, including Back Beach (Bãi Sau), Front Beach (Bãi Trước), Strawberry Beach (Bãi Dâu), Pineapple Beach (Bãi Dứa).

Resorts and theme parks
A big resort project has just been licensed by the Vietnamese government, the Saigon Atlantis. Upon completion, this entertainment project worth US$300 million in capital investment will include resorts, shopping and sailing. The investor of this project is proposing to raise the investment capital to US$4 billion. Two other noteworthy entertainment projects awaiting licensing are Vũng Tàu Aquarium, which will cost US$250 million, and Bàu Trũng, a Disneyland-like entertainment park which will cost US$250 million. The project includes Landmark Tower, an 88-story skyscraper proposed to be built and completed by 2010 in Vũng Tàu by a USA-based company, Good Choice Import – Export Investment Inc, once built will likely be the highest building in Vietnam. The project is under consideration for approval by the local provincial government.

Culture

Holidays and festivals
In Vũng Tàu, one of the most widely celebrated holidays is Lễ hội Cá Ông (Whale Holiday). Festivals in the region include the Kite Festival and World Food Festival Culture Australian tourists come to Vũng Tàu in August to mark the anniversary of the Battle of Long Tân.

Religion
 

As in most provinces and cities in Vietnam, Buddhism is the predominant religion. Mahayana Buddhism, the dominant form of the religion in Vietnam, was brought to Bà Rịa-Vũng Tàu by the Vietnamese settlers from the north at the beginning of the 17th century during the expansion of the Nguyễn lords. When they came bringing their original religion they built many Buddhist pagodas, temples and statues in the city. Three Buddhist temples in particular, Thích Ca Phật Đài, Phổ Đà Sơn Quan Âm Bồ Tát Tự Temple, and Niết Bàn Tịnh Xá temple, draw pilgrims from around the country.

Before the area was settled by ethnic Vietnamese, the Khmer people practiced Theravada Buddhism. The area has some 14 Catholic wards with active services. A notable monument in the city is the Christ of Vũng Tàu, a large statue built by Vietnam's Catholic minority. It was completed in 1974, with the height of 32 metres and two outstretched arms spanning 18.4 metres. It is among the tallest statues of Christ in Asia.

There has been a Russian village in Vũng Tàu ever since the Soviet era; these Russians generally worked for the Russian-Vietnamese joint venture VietSovpetro. It is believed that these "Russians", or "citizens of the former Soviet Union", were once the most dominant group of foreigners in Vũng Tàu. Some have remained in Vũng Tàu after the dissolution of the Soviet Union. They formed a parish of the Russian Orthodox Church. 

One of the Vietnamese whale worship sites, the Lăng Ông Nam Hải Whale Temple, hosts a skeleton of a whale, being respected in the name of Nam Hai General, a whale god. Nam Hai General is said to govern the ocean and protect people from evils, monsters, and disasters, and an annual festival is held in recognition.

Cuisine

Bánh khọt are small round savoury pancakes. Vung Tau has its own variety that is more crispy and has shrimp added on top.

Bánh xèo Vũng Tàu are pancakes famous for its taste which cannot be found in anywhere. Ingredients include rice flour, shrimp, pork, bean sprouts but it tastes is more significant thanks to the crust made from fresh chicken eggs, and the filling full of onions and mushrooms.

Climate

Transport
From Hồ Chí Minh City, it takes about two hours to reach Vũng Tàu by road (51A Expressway), one and a half hours by high speed ferry, or one and a half hours by car on the freeway.

Twin towns – sister cities
Vũng Tàu is twinned with:

Baku, Azerbaijan
Ganja, Azerbaijan
Ha Long, Vietnam
Padang, Indonesia
Parramatta, Australia

A street in Baku is named after Vũng Tàu, while Vũng Tàu has a street named Baku. This commemorates the cooperation in petroleum extraction between Soviet Azerbaijani and Vietnamese specialists in Vũng Tàu in the 1980s.

References

External links

 

Cities in Vietnam
Districts of Bà Rịa-Vũng Tàu province
Bà Rịa-Vũng Tàu province
Populated places in Bà Rịa-Vũng Tàu province